Senator Bingham may refer to:

Hiram Bingham III (1875–1956), U.S. Senator from Connecticut from 1925 to 1933
Kinsley S. Bingham (1808–1861), U.S. Senator from Michigan from 1859 to 1861
William Bingham (1752–1804), U.S. Senator from Pennsylvania from 1795 to 1801
Stan Bingham (born 1945), North Carolina State Senate

See also
Brian Bingman (born 1953), Oklahoma State Senate